Sorry I'm Late is a 2014 album by Cher Lloyd.

Sorry I'm Late may also refer to:

 Sorry I'm Late (John Regan album), 2010
 Sorry I'm Late (EP), a 2021 EP by Bnxn
"Sorry I'm Late", song by Fink from Biscuits for Breakfast
"Sorry I'm Late", 2011 KBS2 Korean drama with Yoon Joo-sang
Sorry I'm Late, an art exhibition by Anthea Hamilton at Firstsite